Delhi Institute of Heritage Research & Management (DIHRM), an autonomous college established by the Government of Delhi is affiliated with Guru Gobind Singh Indraprastha University and located in Qutub Institutional Area in New Delhi. Admission to DIHRM is through the Common Entrance Test (CET) conducted by Guru Gobind Singh Indraprastha University. The institute offers Master in Archaeology and Heritage Management and Master in Conservation, Preservation and Heritage Management courses.

References

Universities and colleges in Delhi
Colleges of the Guru Gobind Singh Indraprastha University